"Without Fear" is a six-issue Daredevil story arc written by Ed Brubaker with art by Michael Lark and published by Marvel Comics focusing on Mr. Fear's latest attempt to ruin Daredevil's life. The arc appears in Daredevil #100-#105.

Plot summary
Mr. Fear resurfaces, along with the Enforcers at his side, providing the criminals of Hell's Kitchen a drug that causes the user to become psychotic and completely unafraid of death. In another attempt to make Daredevil's life miserable, Mr. Fear also gives the drug to Milla Donovan, Daredevil's wife. He is also approached by the Hood and offered a place in his criminal empire which he rejects. Meanwhile, Daredevil hunts down Mr. Fear to force him into giving him an antidote to the drug. After Daredevil tracks down and beats Mr. Fear in a one on one fight, the villain reveals that there is no antidote.

Mr. Fear eventually surrenders to the police and confesses all of his wrongdoings, which sees him being sent to Ryker's Island for imprisonment. After his imprisonment, Mr. Fear quickly rises to the top of the prison hierarchy, gaining respect and fear from prisoner and guard alike. Because his body has the gives off chemicals of pheromone scent with his Fear Toxin, so everyone (inmates and officers) does his best to please him. He knows he can get out whenever he wants to, and strike at Matt again.  Matt sits alone in his room. He's being watched by the Hood. The Hood is impressed by the blow delivered by Mr. Fear, though he thinks it wise not to move things around Hell's Kitchen for a while, letting Matt delude himself thinking that at least he's accomplished one good thing out of the whole situation.

Collected editions
The story arc was collected in a trade paperback as Daredevil: Hell to Pay, Vol. 2.

Reception
IGN gave Daredevil #100-#105, respectively, 7.8, 8.3, 7.6, 8.1 and 9.0 out of 10. The first issue of the story arc, Daredevil #100, with the combined sales of two printings, sold 78,120 copies. Daredevil #105 sold 42,072 copies.

References

External links
Daredevil: Hell to Pay, Vol. 2 at Marvel.com

2007 in comics
Comics by Ed Brubaker
Comics set in New York City